The Rimini International Open was a golf tournament on the Challenge Tour, played in Italy. It was a one-off held 1998 at Rimini Golf Club.

Winners

References

External links
Coverage on the Challenge Tour's official site

Former Challenge Tour events
Golf tournaments in Italy
1998 establishments in Italy
1998 disestablishments in Italy